This was a new event to the WTA 125K series.

Top seed Zheng Saisai won the title, defeating Julia Glushko in the final 2–6, 6–1, 7–5.

Seeds

Main draw

Finals

Top half

Bottom half

References 
 Main draw
 Qualifying draw

Dalian Women's Tennis Open - Singles
2015 Singles
2015 in Chinese tennis